Science and technology in Iceland is well developed with the presence of several universities and research institutes.

Iceland was ranked 20th in the Global Innovation Index in 2022.

Government policy 
Science and technology in Iceland are regulated by the Science and Technology Policy Council, which is chaired by the Prime Minister. In 2021, the government spent 28billion ISK on research, a 130% increase over spending in 2017.

See also 
 Economy of Iceland
 Education in Iceland

References